The South African Railways Class 6E1, Series 10 of 1982 was an electric locomotive.

Between 1982 and 1984, the South African Railways placed 55 Class 6E1,  electric locomotives with a Bo-Bo wheel arrangement in service.

Manufacturer
The 3 kV DC Class 6E1, Series 10 electric locomotive was designed and built for the South African Railways (SAR) by Union Carriage & Wagon (UCW) in Nigel, Transvaal. The electrical equipment was supplied by the General Electric Company (GEC). 

Between 1982 and 1984, 55 locomotives were delivered, numbered in the range from E2086 to E2140. Like Series 6 to 9, the Series 10 units were equipped with AEI-283AY traction motors. UCW did not allocate builder's numbers to the locomotives it built for the SAR, but used the SAR unit numbers for their record keeping.

Characteristics

Orientation
These dual cab locomotives had a roof access ladder on one side only, just to the right of the cab access door. The roof access ladder end was marked as the no. 2 end. A corridor along the centre of the locomotive connected the cabs which were identical apart from the fact that the handbrake was located in cab 2. A pantograph hook stick was stowed in a tube, mounted below the lower edge of the locomotive body on the roof access ladder side. The locomotive had one square and two rectangular access panels along the lower half of the body and a large hatch door below the second small window to the right of the side door on the roof access ladder side, and only one square access panel and a large hatch door below the first window immediately to the right of the door on the opposite side.

Series identifying features
The Class 6E1 was produced in eleven series over a period of nearly sixteen years. While some of the Class 6E1 series are visually indistinguishable from their predecessors or successors, some externally visible changes did occur over the years.

Series 8 and later locomotives could be distinguished from all older models by the large hatch door on each side.

The Series 9 to Series 11 locomotives were visually indistinguishable from each other, but could be distinguished from all earlier models by the rainwater drainage holes on their lower sides. These holes were usually covered by so-called buckets, but the covers were absent on a few locomotives. Another distinction was the end doors, which were recessed into the doorframes on Series 9 to Series 11 locomotives, compared to earlier models which had their end doors flush with the doorframes. In addition, on Series 9 and later, the split side window on the driver's assistant side was replaced by a single rectangular side window with rounded corners. Finally, unlike all earlier models, all four doors on Series 9 to Series 11 locomotives had rounded corners.

Crew access
The Class 5E, 5E1, 6E and earlier 6E1 locomotives were notoriously difficult to enter from ground level, since their lever-style door handles were at waist level when standing inside the cab. This made it impossible to open the door from outside without first climbing up high enough to reach the door handle, while hanging on to the side handrails with one hand only. Crews therefore often chose to leave the doors ajar when parking and exiting the locomotives.

Side doors with two interconnected latch handles on the outside, such as those which were introduced on the Class 7E1, with one outside handle mounted near floor level and the other at mid-door level, were also introduced on Class 6E1 locomotives beginning with Series 9.

Service
The Class 6E1 family saw service all over both 3 kV DC mainline and branch line networks, the smaller Cape Western mainline between Cape Town and Beaufort West and the larger network which covers portions of the Northern Cape, the Free State, Natal, Gauteng, North West and Mpumalanga.

Rebuilding to Class 18E

Beginning in 2000, Spoornet began a project to rebuild Series 2 to 11 Class 6E1 locomotives to Class 18E, Series 1 and Series 2 at the Transnet Rail Engineering (TRE) workshops at Koedoespoort. In the process, the cab at the no. 1 end was stripped of all controls and the driver's front and side windows were blanked off to have a toilet installed, thereby forfeiting the locomotive's bi-directional ability.

Since the driving cab's noise level had to be below 85 decibels, cab 2 was selected as the Class 18E driving cab primarily based on its lower noise level compared to cab 1, which was closer and more exposed to the compressor's noise and vibration. Another factor was the closer proximity of cab 2 to the low voltage switch panel. The fact that the handbrake was located in cab 2 was not a deciding factor but was considered an additional benefit.

While the earlier Class 6E1, Series 2 to 7 locomotives had been built with a brake system which consisted of various valves connected to each other with pipes, commonly referred to as a "bicycle frame" brake system, the Class 6E1, Series 8 to 11 locomotives were built with an air equipment frame brake system, commonly referred to as a brake rack. Since the design of the rebuilt Class 18E locomotives included the same brake rack, the rebuilding project was begun with the newer series 8 to 11 locomotives to reduce the overall cost of rebuilding.

By June 2005 all Series 10 locomotives except numbers E2111 and E2134 were rebuilt to Class 18E, Series 1. The fate of the two exceptions is not known and they are presumed to have been scrapped. The numbers and renumbering details of the rebuilt units are listed in the table.

Liveries
All the Class 6E1, Series 10 locomotives were delivered in the SAR red oxide livery with signal red cowcatchers, yellow whiskers and with the number plates on the sides mounted on three-stripe yellow wings. In the 1990s some of the Series 10 units were repainted in the Spoornet orange livery with a yellow and blue chevron pattern on the cowcatchers.

References

External links

Bo-Bo locomotives
Cape gauge railway locomotives
2960
Railway locomotives introduced in 1982
Union Carriage & Wagon locomotives